Northamptonshire County Cricket Club is one of eighteen first-class county clubs within the domestic cricket structure of England and Wales. It represents the historic county of Northamptonshire. Its limited overs team is called the Northants Steelbacks – a reference to the Northamptonshire Regiment which was formed in 1881. The name was supposedly a tribute to the soldiers' apparent indifference to the harsh discipline imposed by their officers. Founded in 1878, Northamptonshire (Northants) held minor status at first but was a prominent member of the early Minor Counties Championship during the 1890s. In 1905, the club joined the County Championship and was elevated to first-class status, since when the team have played in every top-level domestic cricket competition in England.

The club plays the majority of its games at the County Cricket Ground, Northampton, but has used outlier grounds at Kettering, Wellingborough and Peterborough (formerly part of Northamptonshire, but now in Cambridgeshire) in the past. It has also used grounds outside the county for one-day games: for example, at Luton, Tring and Milton Keynes.

During the 2022 season, Northamptonshire played in Division One of the County Championship. They also played in the North Division of the Royal London One-Day Cup and the North Division of the T20 Blast.

Honours and Achievements

First XI: Honours/Achievements
County Championship (1905-1999) 
 Runners-up (4):  1912, 1957, 1965, 1976
CC Division One (From 2000)
 Best placing - 6th: 2022
CC Division Two (From 2000)
 Winners (1) - 2000
Runners-up (3): 2003, 2013, 2019
NatWest t20 Blast 
 Winners (2) – 2013, 2016
Runners-up (1): 2015
National League/Pro40
Division One
 Runners-up (1): 2006
Division Two
 Runners-up (1): 1999
 3rd place/promoted (1): 2003   
NatWest Trophy
Winners (2) – 1976, 1992
Runners-up (5): 1979, 1981, 1987, 1990, 1995
Benson and Hedges Cup
Winners (1) – 1980
Runners-up (2): 1987, 1996
Minor Counties Championship
Winners (2) – 1903, 1904
Shared (2): 1899, 1900

Second XI: Honours
Second XI Championship
Winners (2) – 1960, 1998

Second XI Trophy
Winners (2) – 1986, 1998

Records

Most first-class runs for Northamptonshire 
Qualification – 20,000 runs

Most first-class wickets for Northamptonshire 
Qualification – 800 wickets

Team totals

Batting

Record partnership for each wicket

Bowling

Wicket-keeping

History

Earliest cricket
Cricket had probably reached Northamptonshire by the end of the 17th century and the first two references to cricket in the county are within a few days of each other in 1741. On Monday 10 August, there was a match at Woburn Park between a Bedfordshire XI and a combined Northants and Huntingdonshire XI.  Woburn Cricket Club under the leadership of the Duke of Bedford was on the point of becoming a well known club.  On Tuesday 18 August, a match played on the Cow Meadow near Northampton between two teams of amateurs from Northamptonshire and Buckinghamshire is the earliest known instance of cricket being played in Northamptonshire county.

Origin of club
On 31 July 1878, the official formation of Northants CCC took place at a meeting in the George Hotel, Kettering based on an existing organisation that dated back to 1820. The 1820 date, if it could be verified, would make Northants the oldest club in the present-day County Championship. The club came to prominence in the Minor Counties Championship during the 1890s as, between 1900 and 1904, the bowling of George Thompson and William East was much too good for almost all batsmen at that level. The county applied for first-class status in 1904 and was promoted the following year when it joined the County Championship. They played its inaugural first-class match versus Hampshire CCC at Southampton on 18, 19 & 20 May 1905 when making its County Championship debut.

Stepping up to first-class
Although Thompson and East proved themselves to be bowlers of high class, a weak batting line-up meant that the team remained close to the bottom of the championship table until Sydney Smith arrived in 1909. After three years in the middle of the table, Northants surprisingly improved to finish second in 1912 and fourth in 1913. Thompson, Smith and William "Bumper" Wells formed one of the strongest attacks in county cricket at the time, whilst Smith and Haywood were the county's best batsmen.

Thompson and Smith finished playing after World War I and, during the inter-war period, Northamptonshire were regularly one of the weaker championship sides. This was exacerbated when Vallance Jupp declined due to age and, despite the arrival of Nobby Clark, a young left arm fast bowler from Huntingdonshire  who burst onto the scene at the age of 20 in 1922 with 20 wickets at an average of 17.10 and Fred Bakewell, an exciting batsman who regularly exceeded 1000 runs a season,  Northamptonshire could only finish above second from last four times between 1923 and 1948, finishing last every year from 1934 to 1938 and enduring a run of 99 matches from 14 May 1935 to 29 May 1939 without a single championship victory, a record that has never been beaten and doesn't look like being beaten in the future. Things got worse for Northamptonshire during this time when Bakewell's career ended due to a broken arm in a car crash that also resulted in the fatality of teammate, Reginald Northway.

The post-war recovery
After the Second World War, things could only get better for Northamptonshire and they started by recruiting widely from other counties and countries, bringing in Freddie Brown from Surrey; the Australians Jock Livingston, George Tribe and Jack Manning; the New Zealander Peter Arnold; and the Cambridge University opening bat and leg-spinner Raman Subba Row. Brown joined as captain in 1949, and led the team to six place in his first season after previous years of disappointment. Under the new leadership of Dennis Brookes (a stalwart batsman for over 20 years), finished second in 1957, their best finish for 45 years. This was mainly due to the bowling attack of Frank Tyson, Vincent Broderick, Michael Allen, George Tribe and Manning. Northamptonshire were widely considered the best team in England in the late 1950s and early 1960s, during this time Keith Andrew, Northants best ever Wicket-keeper broke the records of most victims in an innings and a season.

Subsequently, the club has seen mixed fortunes.  The club has had intermittent success in one-day competitions, but it has still not won the County Championship, although second place was achieved in each of 1957, 1965 and 1976. Nonetheless it has included several famous players qualified for England, including the South African-born batsman Allan Lamb; fast bowler David Larter; the hard hitting opener Colin Milburn, whose career was cut tragically short by an eye injury sustained in a car crash; the reliable batsmen David Steele and Rob Bailey; opening batsman Wayne Larkins; and all-rounders Peter Willey and David Capel.

Several notable overseas players such as Matthew Hayden, Curtly Ambrose, André Nel, Kapil Dev, Mike Hussey, Sarfraz Nawaz, Mushtaq Mohammad, Anil Kumble, Dennis Lillee and Bishen Bedi have starred for the club, which was particularly formidable as a one-day batting outfit in the late 1970s and early 1980s. More recently, Lance Klusener and Monty Panesar have been notable players.

Northants have recently been criticised for the number of Kolpak players in the team, but for the 2009 season there were only three in Andrew Hall, Johan van der Wath and Nicky Boje, and only one in 2013 in Hall.

Ground history

As with all county cricket clubs, Northamptonshire CCC represents the historic county and not any modern or current administrative unit. In Northamptonshire's case, this means the county of Northamptonshire and the Town of Northampton, although the club have in the past played some home matches outside the historic borders such as in Luton and Milton Keynes.

Northamptonshire first played at the county ground in Northampton in 1905, and continue to do so till this day even though Northampton Town F.C. shared the ground up until 1994 when the Cobblers moved to Sixfields Stadium. After the football club moved, the ground at the Abington Avenue was demolished and replaced by a new indoor school which includes seating looking on to the ground. In 2009, Northants cricket announced plans to improve the ground by building two new stands on the scoreboard side of the ground, there will also be a permanent commentary box with a view to have a 'mini Lord's' style media centre.

This following table gives details of every venue at which Northamptonshire have hosted a first-class, List A or Twenty20 cricket match:

Current officials
 President: The Rt Hon. the Lord Naseby
 Chairman: Gavin Warren
 Chief Executive: Ray Payne
 Scorer: Tony Kingston
 Head Groundsman: Craig Harvey

Coaching staff
 Head coach: John Sadler
 Assistant coach Chris Liddle
 Academy director Kevin Innes 
 Batting Coach: Ben Smith 
 Bowling Coach: Chris Liddle 
 Performance coach/Fielding & 2nd XI Coach: Graeme White 
 Performance Cricket Coach: TBA
 Head physiotherapist/Science & Medicine Lead Coach: TBA
 Head Strength& Conditioning Coach: Chris Lorkin

Players

Current squad
The Northamptonshire squad for the 2023 season consists of (this section could change as players are released or signed):
 No. denotes the player's squad number, as worn on the back of their shirt.
  denotes players with international caps.
  denotes a player who has been awarded a county cap.

Notable players
This list is compiled of international cricketers who have played Test and/or ODI cricket. It also includes players who have been mentioned in the '100 Greats: Northamptonshire County Cricket Club' book. Therefore, making them notable to the county and international cricket scene. 

England
 Usman Afzaal
 Michael Allen
 Keith Andrew
 Rob Bailey
 Fred Bakewell
 Desmond Barrick
 Bill Barron
 Benjamin Bellamy
 Robin Boyd-Moss
 Vincent Broderick
 Dennis Brookes
 Freddie Brown
 David Capel
 Bob Carter
 Nobby Clark
 Geoff Cook
 Nick Cook
 Bob Cottam
 Brian Crump
 Ben Duckett
 John Dye
 John Emburey
 Alan Fordham
 Frederick Jakeman
 Vallance Jupp
 Allan Lamb
 Wayne Larkins
 David Larter
 Albert Lightfoot
 Mal Loye
 Devon Malcolm
 Neil Mallender
 Austin Matthews
 Colin Milburn
 John Murdin
 Buddy Oldfield
 Monty Panesar
 Tony Penberthy
 Roger Prideaux
 David Ripley
 David Sales
 George Sharp
 Sydney Smith
 David Steele
 Raman Subba Row
 Haydn Sully
 Graeme Swann
 Paul Taylor
 Albert Thomas
 George Thompson
 John Timms
 Frank Tyson
 Roy Virgin
 Fanny Walden
 David Willey
 Peter Willey
 Claud Woolley

Australia
 Trent Copeland
 Ian Harvey
 Matthew Hayden
 Mike Hussey
 Phil Jaques
 Dennis Lillee
 Jock Livingston
 Martin Love
 Chris Lynn

 Matthew Nicholson
 Chris Rogers
 George Tribe
 Cameron White

South Africa
 Hylton Ackerman
 Nicky Boje
 Johan Botha
 Andrew Hall
 Richard Levi
 Johann Louw
 Rory Kleinveldt
 Lance Klusener
 André Nel
 Johan van der Wath
 Martin van Jaarsveld

India
 Bishan Bedi
 Kapil Dev
 Sourav Ganguly
 Anil Kumble

Pakistan
 Shahid Afridi
 Mohammad Akram
 Mushtaq Mohammad
 Sarfraz Nawaz

West Indies
 Curtly Ambrose
 Winston Davis
 Roger Harper

New Zealand
 Peter Arnold
 Ken James
 James Neesham
 Lou Vincent

Zimbabwe
 Elton Chigumbura
 Kevin Curran
 Blessing Muzarabani

Ireland
 Niall O'Brien

Sri Lanka
 Seekkuge Prasanna
 Chaminda Vaas

Scotland
 David Murphy
 Tom Sole

County captains
A complete list of officially appointed Northamptonshire captains can be found here: List of Northamptonshire cricket captains.

Notable captains:

 Freddie Brown (1949–1953)
 Dennis Brookes (1954–1957)
 Raman Subba Row (1958–1961)
 Keith Andrew (1962–1966)
 Mushtaq Mohammad (1976–1977)
 Allan Lamb (1989–1995)
 Matthew Hayden (1999–2000)
 Mike Hussey (2002–2003)
 Will Young (2022)

County caps
Northamptonshire do not automatically award caps to players on their first appearance; instead, they have to be 'earned' through good performances. In recent times, cricketers who are awarded a county cap are given a new cap with yellow stripes on the maroon instead of a plain maroon cap. The following players have received caps:

1946: W Barron, P.E Murray-Willis
1947: V Broderick, A.W Childs-Clarke, C.B Clarke, K Fiddling, J Webster
1948: A.E Nutter, N Oldfield
1949: F.R Brown, R.W Clarke, R.G Garlick
1950: L Livingston
1951: F Jakeman
1952: D.W Barrick, G.E Tribe
1953: E Davis
1954: K.V Andrew, S Starkie, F.H Tyson
1955: A.P Arnold, R Subba Row
1956: J.S Manning, B.L Reynolds
1957: M.H.J Allen
1960: L.A Johnson, M.E.J.C Norman
1961: J.D.F Larter, A Lightfoot
1962: B.S Crump, R.M Prideaux, P.D Watts, P.J Watts
1963: C Milburn
1964: M.E Scott
1965: D.S Steele
1966: H Sully
1967: Mushtaq Mohammad
1969: H.M Ackerman
1971: P Willey
1972: B.S Bedi, R.M.H Cottam, J.C.J Dye
1973: G Sharp
1974: R.T Virgin
1975: G Cook, Sarfraz Nawaz
1976: A Hodgson, W Larkins
1978: B.J Griffiths, A.J Lamb, T.M Lamb, T.J Yardley
1979: R.G Williams
1984: R.J Boyd-Moss, N.A Mallender
1985: R.J Bailey
1986: D.J Capel, R.A Harper, D.J Wild
1987: N.G.B Cook, W.W Davis, D Ripley, A Walker
1990: C.E.L Ambrose, N.A Felton, A Fordham, M.A Robinson
1991: J.G Thomas
1992: K.M Curran, J.P Taylor
1994: M.B Loye, A.L Penberthy
1995: A Kumble, R.R Montgomerie, R.J Warren
1999: M.L Hayden, D.E Malcolm, D.J.G Sales, G.P Swann
2000: J.F Brown, D.M Cousins
2001: M.E.K Hussey
2003: T.M.B Bailey, J.W Cook, P.A Jaques, A Nel
2005: U Afzaal, B.J Phillips
2006: L Klusener, M.S Panesar
2007: S.D Peters
2008: R.A White, N Boje
2009: J.J van der Wath, A.J Hall, D.S Lucas
2011: J.D Middlebrook, N.J O'Brien, W.P.J.U.C Vaas
2012: J.A Brooks, A.G Wakely
2013: K.J Coetzer, S.P Crook, D.J Willey
2015: M Azharullah
2016: R.K Kleinveldt, B.M Duckett
2017: R.I Newton, R.E Levi, D Murphy
2018: J.J Cobb, B.W Sanderson
2019: R.I Keogh, A.M Rossington
2020: L.A Procter
2021: R.S Vasconcelos

Notes

References

Bibliography

Further reading
H S Altham, A History of Cricket, Volume 1 (to 1914), George Allen & Unwin, 1962
Derek Birley, A Social History of English Cricket, Aurum, 1999
Rowland Bowen, Cricket: A History of its Growth and Development, Eyre & Spottiswoode, 1970
Matthew Engel and Andrew Radd, The History of Northamptonshire CCC (County Cricket History), Christopher Helm Publishers Ltd, 1993, 
H T Waghorn, Cricket Scores, Notes, etc. (1730–1773), Blackwood, 1899
Roy Webber, The Playfair Book of Cricket Records, Playfair Books, 1951
Playfair Cricket Annual – various editions
Wisden Cricketers' Almanack – various editions

External links

BBC Sport 
Sky Sports
Cricinfo
ECB

 
English first-class cricket teams
Cricket in Northamptonshire
History of Northamptonshire
Cricket clubs established in 1878
1878 establishments in England